Blas Antonio Cáceres Garay (born 2 August 1990) is a Paraguayan footballer who plays as a midfielder for Sport Recife, on loan from Libertad.

Career
Cáceres started his professional career in his home country, playing for Olimpia. He then went on to play for Guaraní and Sol de América. In 2014, the midfielder joined General Díaz and helped the team to the second stage of the Copa Sudamericana. After his period at General Díaz, Cáceres joined Paraguayan powerhouse Cerro Porteño, being part of the squad that won the 2015 Apertura of the Paraguayan Primera División.

In 2016, the Paraguayan midfielder joined Vélez Sarsfield in the Argentine Primera División, signing a one and a half year loan, with an option to buy for 80% of his transfer rights. Cáceres debuted in Argentina entering the field in a 3–0 victory against Argentinos Juniors, for the third fixture of the 2016 Argentine Primera División.

On 11 December 2019, Cáceres signed with Club Libertad.

Honours
Cerro Porteño
Paraguayan Primera División (1): 2015 Apertura

References

External links
 Profile at Vélez Sarsfield's official website 
 Blas Cáceres – Argentine Primera statistics at Fútbol XXI  
 

Living people
1990 births
Paraguayan footballers
Paraguayan expatriate footballers
Club Olimpia footballers
Club Guaraní players
Club Sol de América footballers
General Díaz footballers
Cerro Porteño players
Club Libertad footballers
Club Atlético Vélez Sarsfield footballers
Club Atlético Patronato footballers
Sport Club do Recife players
Paraguayan Primera División players
Argentine Primera División players
Campeonato Brasileiro Série B players
Expatriate footballers in Argentina
Expatriate footballers in Brazil
Association football midfielders
People from Itacurubí de la Cordillera
20th-century Paraguayan people
21st-century Paraguayan people